Wang Zihui (born 1892) was a politician, military personnel and journalist in the Republic of China. He was an important person during the Reformed Government of the Republic of China. He was born in Xiamen.

Biography
Wang Zihui went to Japan where he graduated the Department of Law, Waseda University. Later he returned to China, he became a journalist. After that he successively held the positions Chief of the Office to Shanghai for the 2nd Army of Guominjun, Vice-Commander and Chief of the Political Bureau of the 20th Army of National Revolutionary Army, General Councilor of the National Government and a member of the China-Japan Economical Society.

In March 1938 Liang Hongzhi established the Reformed Government of the Republic of China, Wang Zihui also participated in it. He was appointed Minister for Business, but in next June he suddenly resigned his post. Wang had already contacted to H. H. Kung, Wang's resign was also suggested by Kung.

Later Wang Zihui worked for peace between China and Japan, in all likelihood H. H. Kung ordered to him to do so. According to Kung's close adviser Jia Cunde()'s memories, Wang had been good terms with General Shunroku Hata. And from April 1940 he contacted with Lieutenant General Seishirō Itagaki. But his work was not so clearly, and in all likelihood got no fruit.

In 1949 Wang Zihui went to Japan as the representative of the Republic of China. But in next spring he retired from political circles and lived in Japan. On October 31, 1957, on charges of swindling, he was arrested by Japanese authorities. At the time, he made the lie that he was the Chiang Kai-shek's personal envoy.

After this incident, the whereabouts of Wang Zihui were unknown.

Alma mater

Waseda University

References

Footnotes 
 from the Special Edition of Literary & Historical Materials Vol.29 (文史资料选辑 第29辑)

Politicians from Xiamen
National Revolutionary Army generals from Fujian
Kuomintang collaborators with Imperial Japan
Members of the Kuomintang
Republic of China journalists
Chinese collaborators with Imperial Japan
Chinese people of World War II
1892 births
Year of death uncertain
Republic of China politicians from Fujian
Diplomats of the Republic of China
Writers from Fujian
Chinese expatriates in Japan